Viesīte Municipality is a former municipality in Selonia, Latvia. The municipality was formed in 2009 by merging Elkšņi parish, Rite parish, Sauka parish and Viesīte town with its countryside territory, the administrative centre being Viesīte. In 2010 Viesīte parish was created from the countryside territory of Viesīte town. The population in 2020 was 3,500.

On 1 July 2021, Viesīte Municipality ceased to exist and its territory was merged into Jēkabpils Municipality.

Twin towns — sister cities

Viesīte is twinned with:
 Czeladź, Poland
 Pastavy District, Belarus
 Rokiškis, Lithuania
 Zhydachiv, Ukraine

See also
Administrative divisions of Latvia

References

External links
 

 
Former municipalities of Latvia